Stewartstown Railroad Station is a historic railroad station located at Stewartstown, York County, Pennsylvania, USA. The -story, three bay by five bay brick building was built by the Stewartstown Railroad in 1914. It has a slate covered hipped roof. It was used as both a freight and passenger station. It was the second station in Stewartstown, as the original 1884 station was taken out of service so the New Park & Fawn Grove Railroad, which interchanged with and was later operated by the Stewartstown, could be serviced easier. It was once the departing location for the now abandoned railroad's passenger excursion trains.

It was added to the National Register of Historic Places in 1995.

In 2018, the original slate roof was replaced with a new metal roof, after a tree planted at the station's opening dropped limbs on the roof, causing damage.

References

Railway stations on the National Register of Historic Places in Pennsylvania
Railway stations in the United States opened in 1915
Transportation buildings and structures in York County, Pennsylvania
Former railway stations in Pennsylvania
National Register of Historic Places in York County, Pennsylvania